California's 21st State Assembly district is one of 80 California State Assembly districts. It is currently represented by Democrat Adam Gray of Merced.

District profile 
The district is located in the heart of the Central Valley, sandwiched between Modesto and Fresno. The district is primarily rural and agricultural.

All of Merced County
 Atwater
 Dos Palos
 Gustine
 Livingston
 Los Banos
 Merced

Stanislaus County – 39.9%
 Ceres
 Modesto – 38.4%
 Newman
 Patterson

Election results from statewide races

List of Assembly Members 
Due to redistricting, the 21st district has been moved around different parts of the state. The current iteration resulted from the 2011 redistricting by the California Citizens Redistricting Commission.

Election results 1992 - present

2020

2018

2016

2014

2012

2010

2008

2006

2004

2002

2000

1998

1996

1994

1992

See also 
 California State Assembly
 California State Assembly districts
 Districts in California

References

External links 
 District map from the California Citizens Redistricting Commission

21
Government of Merced County, California
Government of Stanislaus County, California
San Joaquin Valley
Ceres, California
Los Banos, California
Merced, California
Modesto, California